Strong may refer to:

Education
 The Strong, an educational institution in Rochester, New York, United States
 Strong Hall (Lawrence, Kansas), an administrative hall of the University of Kansas
 Strong School, New Haven, Connecticut, United States, an overflow school for district kindergartners and first graders

Music

Albums
 Strong (Anette Olzon album), 2021
 Strong (Arrested Development album), 2010
 Strong (Michelle Wright album), 2013
 Strong (Thomas Anders album), 2010
 Strong (Tracy Lawrence album), 2004
 Strong, a 2000 album by Clare Quilty

Songs
 "Strong" (London Grammar song), 2013
 "Strong" (One Direction song), 2013
 "Strong" (Robbie Williams song), 1998
 "Strong", a song by After Forever from Remagine
 "Strong", a song by Audio Adrenaline from Worldwide
 "Strong", a song by LeAnn Rimes from Whatever We Wanna
 "Strong", a song by London Grammar from If You Wait
 "Strong", a song by Will Hoge from Never Give In
 "Strong", a song from the 2015 film Cinderella

People and fictional characters
 Strong (surname), including lists of people and fictional characters
 Strong Vincent (1837–1863), American Civil War Union Army brigadier general and lawyer

Places

United States
 Strong, Arkansas, a city
 Strong, Maine, a town
 Strong, Mississippi, an unincorporated community
 Strong, Pennsylvania, a census-designated place
 Fort Strong, Boston harbor, Massachusetts
 Strong City, Kansas, a city
 Strong City, Oklahoma, a town
 Strong Island (Michigan)
 Strong Island, Pleasant Bay, Cape Cod, Massachusetts
 Strong River, Mississippi
 Strong Township, Chase County, Kansas

Elsewhere
 Strong, Ontario, Canada, a township
 Mount Strong, Antarctica
 Strong Peak, Antarctica
 22622 Strong, an asteroid

Other uses
 Strong Memorial Hospital, University of Rochester Medical Center, Rochester, New York, United States
 SK Strong, a Norwegian sports club that merged into Grüner IL in 1952
 USS Strong, two United States Navy destroyers
 Strong (TV series), an American reality show which debuted in 2016
 Strong!, a 2012 documentary about Olympic weightlifter Cheryl Haworth
 Strong (advertisement), a controversial advertisement by the 2012 US presidential candidate Rick Perry
 Strong Capital Management, a defunct American financial services firm

See also

 List of people known as the Strong
 Strong House (disambiguation), various buildings listed on the National Register of Historic Places
 Strong v Bird, an 1874 English property law case
 Strong's Concordance, a concordance of the King James Bible
 Stronger (disambiguation)
 Strength (disambiguation)